The discography of Action Bronson, an American rapper from Flushing, Queens, New York, consists of six studio albums, one collaborative album, three extended plays (EPs), four mixtapes and thirty-three singles (including thirteen as a featured artist).

Studio albums

EPs

Mixtapes

Singles

As lead artist

As featured artist

Other charted songs

Guest appearances

Production discography

2011 
Action Bronson - Bon Appetit..... Bitch!!!!!

 4. "Shiraz"
 10. "Mofongo" (featuring Shaz One)

2020 
Action Bronson - Only For Dolphins
 1. "Capoeira" (featuring Yung Mehico)
 5. "Mongolia" (featuring Hologram and Meyhem Lauren)

2022 
Action Bronson - Cocodrillo Turbo 

 2. "Tongpo" (featuring Conway the Machine)
 8. "Zambezi" (featuring Roc Marciano)

Music videos

Notes

References 

Discographies of American artists
Hip hop discographies